Psychedelic Lollipop is the debut album by the American rock band the Blues Magoos, and is one of the first records to have the word “psychedelic” on the sleeve. Their single “(We Ain't Got) Nothin' Yet” was their most successful effort, rising into the Top 10 on many national charts. Guitarist “Peppy” Theilhelm was 16 years old at the time of the single’s release. The band recorded five more albums with various lineups, none reaching the success of Psychedelic Lollipop.

"Sometimes I Think About" is credited to members of the band, but is actually a traditional folk song.

Reception

AllMusic critic Mark Deming felt that Blues Magoos sounded more like a solid garage band than a psychedelic band. He especially praised their version of "Tobacco Road". He wrote in his review "Psychedelic Lollipop rarely sounds like a classic, but it's solid stuff — the covers are chosen and played well... Psychedelic Lollipop doesn't sound like the work of a great band, but certainly like one who were better than average, and considering how many bands who cranked out a single like "(We Ain't Got) Nothin' Yet" ended up making albums clogged with filler, it says a lot that even the weakest tracks here show this group had talent, ideas, and the know-how to make them work in the studio."

Track listing
 "(We Ain't Got) Nothin' Yet" (Mike Esposito, Ron Gilbert, Ralph Scala) – 2:10
 "Love Seems Doomed" (Esposito, Gilbert, Scala) – 3:02
 "Tobacco Road" (John D. Loudermilk)  – 4:30
 "Queen of My Nights" (David Blue)  – 2:52
 "I’ll Go Crazy" (James Brown)  – 1:58
 "Gotta Get Away" (Ritchie Adams, Alan Gordon)  – 2:35
 "Sometimes I Think About" (Esposito, Gilbert, Scala) – 3:35
 "One by One" (Gilbert, Emil Theilhelm) – 2:45
 "Worried Life Blues" (Big Maceo Merriweather) – 3:45
 "She’s Coming Home" (Roger Atkins, Helen Miller) – 2:36

Personnel

Blues Magoos
 Ralph Scala – keyboards, vocals
 Emil “Peppy” Theilhelm – guitar, vocals
 Ron Gilbert – bass guitar, vocals
 Mike Esposito – guitar
 Geoff Daking – drums, percussion

Technical
 Art Polhemus – producer, engineer
 Bob Wyld – producer, liner notes
 Shelby S Singleton Jr. – executive producer

Charts
Album - Billboard (USA)

Album – RPM (Canada)

Singles - Billboard (USA)

Singles – RPM (Canada)

References

External links
 Blues Magoos on classicbands.com
 [ Blues Magoos on allmusic.com] (Reference)
 

1966 debut albums
Mercury Records albums
Fontana Records albums
Repertoire Records albums
Blues Magoos albums